Taiwani albipuncta is a moth of the family Erebidae first described by Wileman in 1915. It is known from Taiwan.

Adults have been found in March, April, May and June. There are probably several generations per year.

The wingspan is 14–17 mm. The forewing is relatively narrow and brown, with a bright, ovoid, yellow reniform stigma. The crosslines are indistinct or mostly absent, except for the terminal line, which is marked by tight black interveinal spots. The antemedian and postmedian lines are well marked only near the costa. The hindwing is greyish brown with an indistinct discal spot. The underside of the upper forewing is part brownish and otherwise grey brown, without a pattern. The underside of the upper hindwing is part brownish, while the lower part is light grey, with a discal spot.

References

Micronoctuini
Moths described in 1915